Thomas Mikal Ford (September 5, 1964 – October 12, 2016) was an American actor and comedian. He was best known for his role as Thomas "Tommy" Strawn on the FOX sitcom Martin, which originally aired from 1992 until 1997. He also had a recurring role as Mel Parker in the UPN sitcom The Parkers from 1999 until 2001. He was also known for his role as Lt. Malcolm Barker on New York Undercover, which also aired on FOX for its final season.

Early life and education
Ford was born in Los Angeles and raised in Long Beach, California. His mother worked as a school secretary and his father as a pipe-fitter. As a child, Ford wanted to be a preacher. When he took drama lessons and started acting in high school plays, he decided to go into acting instead. After earning Associate of Arts degree from Long Beach City College in 1985, Ford transferred to the University of Southern California, where he graduated with a Bachelor of Fine Arts degree in acting.

Career
On Martin, Ford played Tommy Strawn; for this role, he received an NAACP Image Awards nomination in 1996 in the category of Outstanding Supporting Actor in a Comedy Series.

After Martin ended, Ford found success in the detective drama New York Undercover as Lieutenant Malcolm Barker. He appeared on the UPN sitcom The Parkers in the recurring role of Nikki's ex-husband and Kim's father, Mel Parker, in seven episodes. He played Ben Cummings in The Power of Passion as one of the characters whose wife cheats on him with the pastor. He was also known as "The Pope of Comedy", due to exposure as a judge on TV One's comedy competition show Bill Bellamy's Who's Got Jokes?  In feature films, Ford appeared in the Kid 'n Play movie Class Act as "Mink". In Harlem Nights, he played Tommy Smalls, the brother of Arsenio Hall's character. In 1997, he played Detective Siegel in the crime drama Against the Law.

In 1993, Ford directed and produced the play South of Where We Live, about six African-American professionals who return to the communities where they were raised and learn about the social issues that now exist. The play was performed at the Los Angeles Ebony Showcase Theatre, the oldest black theater in the country. Ford chose the Ebony Showcase in order to raise money for the theater, which was in danger of closing. The same year, he directed the play Jonin, a comedy about fraternity life at a historically black college in Washington, D.C.

Ford co-hosted the Texas Gospel Music Awards in 1993 with singer Yolanda Adams and actor Troy Curvey. In 1998, Ford founded a 501(c)(3) nonprofit organization called Be Still and Know. The organization's mission was to build better communities for youth.

Ford wrote two inspirational books for children, titled Positive Attitude and I Am Responsible for Me. Ford spent time traveling to schools to inspire and empower children, and encourage responsibility. In June 2016 (four months before his death), Ford directed a documentary on bullying, entitled Through My Lens Atl; it aired in October 2016, on Aspire TV.

Personal life and death
Ford was married to Gina Sasso from 1997 to 2014. They had two children. Ford moved from Los Angeles to Kendall, Florida around 2001. In 2015, Ford moved to Atlanta where he lived with his girlfriend Viviane Brazil. Ford died from a ruptured abdominal aneurysm on October 12, 2016, at a hospital in the Atlanta area. He was 52 years old.

Filmography

Film and TV Movies

Television

References

External links

1964 births
2016 deaths
African-American male actors
American male film actors
American male television actors
Deaths from aneurysm
Long Beach City College alumni
People from Kendall, Florida
People from Yonkers, New York
USC School of Dramatic Arts alumni
20th-century African-American people
21st-century African-American people